Lukas Zeliska (born 8 January 1988) is a Slovak professional ice hockey player who is currently under contract with Graoullys de Metz in the FFHG Division 3 in France. He previously played in the Czech Extraliga with HC Oceláři Třinec. He was selected by the New York Rangers in the 7th round (204th overall) of the 2006 NHL Entry Draft.

External links

1988 births
Living people
Anglet Hormadi Élite players
Boxers de Bordeaux players
Corsaires de Dunkerque players
HC Havířov players
LHK Jestřábi Prostějov players
MHC Martin players
HC Oceláři Třinec players
New York Rangers draft picks
Sportspeople from Martin, Slovakia
Prince Albert Raiders players
Slovak ice hockey centres
Slovak expatriate ice hockey players in Canada
Slovak expatriate ice hockey players in the Czech Republic
Slovak expatriate sportspeople in France
Expatriate ice hockey players in France